Heydarabad (also Romanized as Ḩeydarābād) is a village in Khalili Rural District, in the Central District of Gerash County, Fars Province, Iran. At the 2016 census, its population was 19, in 4 families.

References 

Populated places in Gerash County